State Route 662 (SR 662, OH 662) is a north–south state highway in the central part of Ohio, a U.S. state.

Route description
Along its way, State Route 662 passes through western Guernsey County, extreme northeastern Muskingum County and southeastern Coshocton County.  The route is not a part of the National Highway System, a network of highways deemed most important for the nation's economy, mobility and defense.

History
State Route 662 was established in 1937 along the alignment that it currently occupies.  It has not experienced any major changes to its routing since its inception.

Major intersections

References

External links

 State Route 662 Endpoint Photos

662
Transportation in Guernsey County, Ohio
Transportation in Muskingum County, Ohio
Transportation in Coshocton County, Ohio